Foma may refer to:

 FOMA (Freedom of Mobile Multimedia Access), a Japanese mobile telecommunications service.
 Foma, a term meaning "harmless untruths" from the fictional religion Bokononism in Kurt Vonnegut's novel Cat's Cradle
 Foma, the narrator of Nikolai Gogol's short story "A Bewitched Place"
 Foma, Russian male given name of Hebrew origin
 Foma (album), by The Nixons
 foma (software), an open-source compiler, programming language, and C library for constructing finite-state automata and transducers compatible with Xerox lexc and twolc
 Foma Bohemia, a manufacturer of photographic and industrial films, papers and chemicals in the Czech republic
 Friends of Mount Athos (FoMA), a society that focuses on the monasteries of Mount Athos